Craspedortha is a genus of moths in the family Sphingidae. The genus was erected by Rudolf Mell in 1922.

Species
Craspedortha montana Cadiou, 2000
Craspedortha porphyria (Butler, 1876)

References

Smerinthini
Moth genera